Franz Antel (28 June 1913 – 11 August 2007)  was a veteran Austrian filmmaker.

Born in Vienna, Antel worked mainly as a film producer in the interwar years. After World War II, he began writing and directing films on a large scale. In the late 1940s, 1950s and 1960s these were mainly comedies (romantic, slapstick, and/or musical) and K.u.k. films all of which, for Austrian and German TV stations alike, have been a staple of weekend afternoon programming ever since. In between there is quite a sober film about the Oberst (Colonel) Redl affair that shook the Austro-Hungarian Monarchy on the eve of World War I. Antel himself later commented on this period, "I always wanted to provide good entertainment for the people at the cinema. After the screening, people should say: Well now, I am in a good mood, I will go out and have a glass of wine." (German original: "Ich wollte die Leute im Kino immer gut unterhalten. Die Besucher sollten nach der Filmvorführung sagen: So, jetzt bin ich gut aufgelegt, jetzt geh ich auf ein Viertel Wein.")

From the late 1960s, encouraged by the new opportunities in the film industry brought about by the sexual revolution, Antel gradually switched his main interest to soft porn and ribaldry. It was in particular his series of Frau Wirtin ("hostess") films, directed under the pseudonym François Legrand, with which he tried to win international recognition. Titles included The Sweet Sins of Sexy Susan (1967), Sexy Susan Sins Again (1968),  (1969) and Don't Tell Daddy (aka Naughty Nymphs in the U.S.A.) (1972).

Antel would recount an anecdote about himself describing how, in order to live up to his reputation as a womanizer, he used to carry a pair of high heels in his luggage which he then would occasionally place in the corridor in front of his hotel room – especially when he was travelling alone.

Among the best known actors Antel had worked with from the 1940s to the 1970s were Hans Moser, Paul Hörbiger, Oskar Werner, Curd Jürgens, Tony Curtis, Herbert Fux, Heinrich Schweiger, Arthur Kennedy, Carroll Baker, Edwige Fenech, George Hilton, Marisa Berenson, Britt Ekland, Andréa Ferréol.

1981 was a turning point in Antel's career when he adapted for the big screen a stage play by Ulrich Becher and Peter Preses. Set from the days of the Anschluss of 1938 until after the end of the war, Der Bockerer is about a Viennese butcher named Karl Bockerer (Karl Merkatz) whose common sense rather than intellect tells him to oppose the Nazis and who dares to show resistance just because he is never fully aware of the possible fateful consequences of his actions. While Bockerer and his wife survive the war unscathed, their son joins the SA but, after some internal intrigue, is sent to the front and killed. The film was entered into the 12th Moscow International Film Festival.

The film's strong anti-fascist message, the moving dialogue, and performances by the crème de la crème of Austrian actors and actresses (Ida Krottendorf, Alfred Böhm, Heinz Marecek, Hans Holt, Dolores Schmidinger and many more) made Der Bockerer an unusually successful film and gave new impetus to Antel's career. He made three sequels, which follow the lives of the Bockerers well into the 1960s, each depicting a crucial historical event in Austria or one of its neighbouring countries:

Der Bockerer II (1996) is about the ten-year occupation (1945-1955) of Austria by the allied powers;
Der Bockerer III — Die Brücke von Andau (2000) is set at the time of the 1956 Hungarian Revolution; and, finally,
Der Bockerer IV — Der Prager Frühling (2003) deals with the historical event of Alexander Dubček's Prague Spring in 1968.

Selected filmography
 My Daughter Lives in Vienna (1940)
 The Singing House (1948)
 No Sin on the Alpine Pastures (1950)
 The Mine Foreman (1952)
 Ideal Woman Sought (1952)
  (1952)
 The Emperor Waltz (1953)
  (1953)
 The Sweetest Fruits (1954)
 The Red Prince (1954)
 Roses from the South (1954)
 The Congress Dances (1955)
 Marriage Sanitarium (1955)
 Espionage (1955)
 Emperor's Ball (1956)
 Love, Girls and Soldiers (1958)
  (1959)
  (1962)
  (1964)
  (1964)
 Call of the Forest (1965)
  (1967)
 The Sweet Sins of Sexy Susan (1967)
  (1968)
 Sexy Susan Sins Again (1968)
 Why Did I Ever Say Yes Twice? (1969)
  (1969)
 House of Pleasure (1969)
 My Father, the Ape and I (1971)
  (1972)
 Blue Blooms the Gentian (1973)
  (1975)
  (1976)
 Casanova & Co. (1977)
 Love Hotel in Tyrol (1978)
 Der Bockerer (1981)
  (1987)
  (1996)
  (2000)
  (2003)

Further reading
Franz Antel, Christian F. Winkler: Hollywood an der Donau. Geschichte der Wien-Film in Sievering. Vienna, 1991

Autobiographies 
 Franz Antel (with Peter Orthofer): Verdreht, verliebt, mein Leben, Vienna, Munich 2001
 Franz Antel (with Ingrid Pachmann and Peter Orthofer): „Servus Franz, grüß dich!“ Anekdoten aus 75 Jahren Filmschaffen von Franz Antel. Der Antel in Bildern und Anekdoten, Vienna 2006
 Franz Antel (with Bernd Buttinger): Franz Antel. Ein Leben für den Film, Mariahof 2006

References

External links 
 

1913 births
2007 deaths
Austrian film producers
Austrian film directors
Austrian male screenwriters
Film people from Vienna
Burials at the Vienna Central Cemetery
20th-century Austrian screenwriters
20th-century Austrian male writers
Film directors from Vienna